SheZow is an animated superhero series and sitcom. It features the adventures of a boy who inadvertently inherits the role of a superheroine, which imposes an explicit feminine theme to his costumed appearance and equipment.

It began airing on Network Ten in Australia on 15 December 2012. The series is aimed at children from 6 to 11 years old. Produced by Moody Street Kids and Kickstart Productions, it is distributed by DHX Media, and funded in part by Film Victoria. It was designed by Australian artist Kyla May.

, 52 eleven-minute episodes have been made, which are broadcast in pairs to make one season of 26 half-hour episodes. In a 2013 interview, Wade expressed interest in making a second season.

In a 2016 interview, Wade mentioned that he went on to start season 2 production of SheZow at Hub Network with a bigger budget than the first season. However, after Hub Network went under a major rebranding to Discovery Family, Wade was informed that SheZow season 2 production came to a halt. However, Wade had mentioned that there would be a comic series of SheZow released under his own company, Obieco Entertainment. He released the debut Issue of the SheZow comic series sometime in 2015. Wade had also mentioned that the second issue would release the next year after Issue #1 on Christmas. As of September 2022, Issue #2 was never published.

Synopsis
The series' protagonist, a 12-year-old boy named Guy Hamdon, discovers the superheroine SheZow's ring of power inherited from his late Aunt Agnes; then subsequently puts it on and transforms into a female costumed crime-fighter by uttering the phrase "You Go Girl!"

As it is now on his finger, and thus also cannot be removed as a result, Guy uses the power ring to become SheZow; but while it does grant him superpowers, it was only meant to be worn by a girl, so Guy must wear a female superhero costume and pretend that he is a girl while fighting crime.

Voice cast

Cast
 Jacquie Brennan as Sheila, Tara, Grilla, Null, Madame Curiador
 Lyall Brooks as Brian Smirk, Tattoosalla, Coldfinger, Mocktopus, Wackerman, Senior Yo-Yo, Count Pussenbite, Mister Cylinder, Mega Monkey, Caped Koala, Crash Thunder, Aristotle, Brouhaha, Dr. Frankenweather, Fibberachee, Maj. Attitude, Manny Ken, Void, Periwinkle, Spit Bubble, Moocher, Pirate Posse, Dudley, Kelli, Captain XL, Mayor Stanley, Link, Sarcazmo, Wishington, Tad, McSniff, Legal Cat
 David-Myles Brown as Guy/SheZow (Australia & New Zealand only),  Moocher, Pirate Posse
 Dan Hamill as Officer Boxter, Candy Rapper, Le Pigeon, Moocher, Freddie Fartonavich
 Matt Hill as Maz
 Diana Kaarina as Kelly
 Justin Kennedy as Big Chow Slim
 Elizabeth Nabben as Droosha, Aunt Agnes, Mrs. Creature, Baby Scarington, Uma Thermal
 Samuel Vincent as Guy/SheZow (North America only), SheZap
 Cecelia Ramsdale as Gal/DudePow, Maizy, Wanda

Crew
 Terry Klassen – voice supervisor
 Dale Warren – voice director / sound designer / sound mixer

Development and production

The concept was originally created by Obie Scott Wade as a short film for Disney Channel's Shorty McShorts' Shorts in 2007, which in turn was based on a more adult-oriented short of his named SheeZaam.

In a 2013 interview, Wade stated that the inspiration for SheZow was based on his experiences of watching Saturday-morning cartoons and a general love for superheroes. "When I was a kid I watched a show on Saturday mornings called Shazam! ... it was Shazam and Isis and I just thought it would be interesting to see what would happen if he accidentally said 'SHE-zam,' would he get a different costume or become a different hero?" He added that a lot of the facets to SheZow's mythology came about from the women writers on his team. "I asked the women on my team ... what would be a good weakness for a woman superhero and they all said, 'Bad hair!' ... A lot of the gadgets and jokes [for 'SheZow'] came from women."

Controversy
SheZow has a gender-bending character named Guy Hamdon, who transforms into the titular character. However, the show gained attention from anti-LGBT activists who claimed that Guy would "confuse children about gender," with GLAAD saying that the show is appropriate and that the concept of a superhero having a new persona to be a crime fighter is "very familiar to children." The creator of the show, Obie Scott Wade, denied claims by those such as Ben Shapiro on Breitbart News on the show, stating that there was no "political agenda," and that the critics were reading "a lot into it," saying that the show focuses more on the responsibility of the protagonist and "less about gender." He also said that gender issues were not explored much in the show, and stated in another interview that "SheZow is not transgendered" but is a boy whose gender "never changes" as he is trapped "in a silly costume."

Episodes

Broadcast
In the United States, it was added to the schedule lineup of the Hub Network (now Discovery Family) on 1 June 2013 and aired on Discovery Family until 27 December 2015. In the United Kingdom, the series was on Kix in 2016 (later became Pop Max). It is shown on 10 Peach (formerly Eleven) and 7TWO in Australia. Series 1 was streaming on Netflix from 2015 to 2017.

Reception
The show was considered controversial by several Christian groups for using cross-dressing and transvestism as a source of humour, with One Million Moms, an affiliate of the American Family Association being one of the groups targeting it. In response, series creator Obie Scott Wade stated, "SheZow is not transgendered. He's a boy, his gender never changes, he's just trapped in a silly costume." He also added that he does not find it child-inappropriate at all, because the idea came to him in his youth.

References

External links
 
 SheZow on ABC ME
 Kix Homepage
 SheZow's Final Homepage on the Hub Network via Wayback Machine

Network 10 original programming
10 Peach original programming
2012 Australian television series debuts
2012 Canadian television series debuts
2013 Australian television series endings
2013 Canadian television series endings
2010s Australian animated television series
2010s Canadian animated television series
Australian children's animated action television series
Australian children's animated adventure television series
Australian children's animated comic science fiction television series
Australian children's animated science fantasy television series
Australian children's animated superhero television series
Canadian children's animated action television series
Canadian children's animated adventure television series
Canadian children's animated comic science fiction television series
Canadian children's animated science fantasy television series
Canadian children's animated superhero television series
Television shows set in the United States
Child superheroes
Cross-dressing in television
Fictional empaths
Fictional characters with precognition
Fictional characters who can manipulate sound
Fictional characters who can move at superhuman speeds
Fictional characters with superhuman strength
Animated television series about twins
Television superheroes
Television controversies in Australia
Television controversies in Canada
Television series by DHX Media
Australian flash animated television series
Canadian flash animated television series
English-language television shows
Animated television series about children
Anime-influenced Western animated television series
Animation controversies in television
LGBT-related controversies in television
LGBT-related controversies in animation